James Lowell Stoltzfus (born July 15, 1949) is a former Republican state senator, having represented Maryland's 38th Legislative District. He was also a member of the Maryland House of Delegates for District 38.

Early life and education
James Lowell Stoltzfus was born in Pottstown, Pennsylvania, the second of six children. His parents were both Mennonite, and his grandfather was born to an Amish family. At five years old, he moved to Snow Hill, where his father was starting a Mennonite church. He attended a Mennonite boarding school in Pennsylvania, then attended Salisbury University. He majored in English and Sociology, and was a played center on the basketball team. He then completed a year of seminary at Eastern Mennonite University.

After graduation, Stoltzfus began teaching English and music at Pocomoke High School in Pocomoke City. Following this, he took over his father's plant nursery and expanded the family farm.

Career
Stoltzfus has been a member of the Maryland Senate since January 1992. He became Minority Leader in the Maryland Senate in 2001.

In 1998 Stoltzfus co-sponsored a bill that would have allowed Eastern Shore of Maryland residents to vote in a straw poll on secession from Maryland. He has been an outspoken critic of the University of Maryland, College Park's inability to control the illegal, often violent and destructive actions of the student body.

On August 6, 2009, Senator Stoltzfus announced that he would not seek reelection in 2010 so that he may spend more time with his wife and work at his nursery.

Political views
Stoltzfus is anti-abortion and a fiscal conservative. He "rarely breaks from his party".

Personal life
Stoltlzfus is a Mennonite, and teaches weekly Sunday school classes to adults. While serving in the Maryland State Senate, he was one of two members that worked as farmers, owning over 500 acres of farmland.

His wife Sharon is also Mennonite, and they first met in high school. They have four children.

References

1949 births
American Mennonites
Living people
Eastern Mennonite University alumni
Politicians from Pottsville, Pennsylvania
Republican Party members of the Maryland House of Delegates
Republican Party Maryland state senators
Salisbury University alumni
21st-century American politicians